Trieste is a city and seaport in northeastern Italy. It is the capital city, and largest city, of the autonomous region of Friuli Venezia Giulia, one of two autonomous regions which are not subdivided into provinces.

The city has a long coastline and is surrounded by grassland, forest, and karstic areas. The city has a subtropical climate, unusual in relation to its relatively high latitude, due to marine breezes. In 2022, it had a population of about 204,302. Trieste is the capital of the autonomous region of Friuli Venezia Giulia and was previously capital of the Province of Trieste, until its abolition on 1 October 2017.

Trieste belonged to the Habsburg monarchy from 1382 until 1918. In the 19th century the monarchy was one of the Great Powers of Europe and Trieste was its most important seaport. As a prosperous trading hub in the Mediterranean region, Trieste became the fourth largest city of the Austro-Hungarian Empire (after Vienna, Budapest, and Prague). In the fin de siècle period it emerged as an important hub for literature and music. Trieste underwent an economic revival during the 1930s, and the Free Territory of Trieste became a major site of the struggle between the Eastern and Western blocs after the Second World War.

Trieste, a deep-water port, is a maritime gateway for northern Italy, Germany, Austria and Central Europe. It is considered the end point of the maritime Silk Road, with its connections to the Suez Canal and Turkey. Since the 1960s, Trieste has emerged as a prominent research location in Europe because of its many international organisations and institutions. The city lies at the intersection of Latin, Slavic and Germanic cultures where Central Europe meets the Mediterranean Sea, and is home to diverse ethnic groups and religious communities.

Trieste has the highest percentage of researchers in Europe in relation to population. "Città della Barcolana", "Città della bora", "Città del vento", "Vienna by the sea" and "City of coffee" are also idioms used to describe Trieste.

Names and etymology

The most likely origin is a Celtic word, Tergeste – with the -est- suffix typical of Venetic – and derived from the hypothetical Illyrian word *terg- "market" (etymologically cognate to the Albanian term  'market, marketplace' and reconstructed Proto-Slavic "*tъrgъ") Roman authors also transliterated the name as Tergestum (according to Strabo, the name of the oppidum Tergestum originated from the three battles the Roman Army had to engage in with local tribes, "TER GESTUM [BELLUM]").

Geography
Trieste lies in the northernmost part of the high Adriatic in northeastern Italy, near the border with Slovenia. The city lies on the Gulf of Trieste. Built mostly on a hillside that becomes a mountain, Trieste's urban territory lies at the foot of an imposing escarpment that comes down abruptly from the Karst Plateau towards the sea. It lies at the junction point of the Italian geographical region, the Balkan Peninsula, and Mitteleuropan Area.

Climate

The territory of Trieste is composed of several different climate zones depending on the distance from the sea and elevation. It has a humid subtropical climate (according to the Köppen climate classification).

Trieste, like the Istrian Peninsula, has evenly distributed rainfall above  in total; it is noteworthy that no true summer drought occurs. Snow occurs on average 0–2 days per year. Temperatures are very mild; lows below 0° are somewhat rare and highs above  are not common. Maximum Winter highs are lower than the average temperatures in the Mediterranean zone (~ 5–11 °C) but with quite high minimums (~2–8 °C).

The Trieste area is divided into 8a–10a zones according to USDA hardiness zoning; Villa Opicina (320 to 420 MSL) with 8a in upper suburban area down to 10a in especially shielded and windproof valleys close to the Adriatic sea.

City districts 

Trieste is administratively divided in seven districts, which in turn are further subdivided into parishes (frazioni):

 Altipiano Ovest: Borgo San Nazario · Contovello (Kontovel) · Prosecco (Prosek) · Santa Croce (Križ)
 Altipiano Est: Banne (Bani) · Basovizza (Bazovica) · Gropada (Gropada) · Opicina (Opčine) · Padriciano (Padriče) · Trebiciano (Trebče)
 Barcola · Cologna · Conconello (Ferlugi) · Gretta · Grignano (Grljan) · Guardiella · Miramare · Roiano · Scorcola (Škorklja)
 Barriera Nuova · Borgo Giuseppino · Borgo Teresiano · Città Nuova · Città Vecchia · San Vito · San Giusto · Campi Elisi · Sant'Andrea · Cavana
 Barriera Vecchia (Stara Mitnica) · San Giacomo (Sveti Jakob) · Santa Maria Maddalena Superiore (Sveta Marija Magdalena Zgornja)
 Cattinara (Katinara) · Chiadino · San Luigi · Guardiella (Verdelj) · Longera · San Giovanni (Sveti Ivan)· Rozzol · Melara
 Chiarbola · Coloncovez (Kolonkovec) · Santa Maria Maddalena Inferiore · Raute · Santa Maria Maddalena Superiore · Servola (Škedenj) · Poggi Paese · Poggi Sant'Anna (Sveta Ana)· Valmaura · Altura · Borgo San Sergio

The iconic city centre is Piazza Unità d'Italia, which is located in between the large 19th-century avenues (Borgo Teresiano) and the old medieval city, composed of many narrow streets.

History

Ancient history

Since the second millennium BC, the location was an inhabited site. Originally an Illyrian settlement, the Veneti entered the region in the 10th–9th c. BC and seem to have given the town its name, Tergeste, since terg* is a Venetic word meaning market (q.v. Oderzo whose ancient name was Opitergium). Later, the town was captured by the Carni, a tribe of the Eastern Alps, before becoming part of the Roman republic in 177 BC during the Second Istrian War.

After being attacked by barbarians from the interior in 52 BC, until 46 BC it was granted the status of Roman colony under Julius Caesar, who recorded its name as Tergeste in Commentarii de Bello Gallico (51 BC), in which he recounts events of the Gallic Wars.

In imperial times the border of Roman Italy moved from the Timavo River to Formione (today Risano). Roman Tergeste flourished due to its position on the road from Aquileia, the main Roman city in the area, to Istria, and as a port, some ruins of which are still visible. Emperor Augustus built a line of walls around the city in 33–32 BC, while Trajan built a theatre in the 2nd century. At the same time, the citizens of the town were enrolled in the tribe Pupinia. In 27 BC, Trieste was incorporated in Regio X of Augustan Italia.

In the early Christian era Trieste continued to flourish. Between 138 and 161 AD, its territory was enlarged and nearby Carni and Catali were granted Roman citizenship by the Roman Senate and Emperor Antoninus Pius at the pleading of a leading Tergestine citizen, the quaestor urbanus, Fabius Severus.

Already at the time of the Roman Empire there was a fishing village called Vallicula ("small valley") in the Barcola area. Remains of richly decorated Roman villas, including wellness facilities, piers and extensive gardens suggest that Barcola was already a place for relaxation among the Romans because of its favourable microclimate, as it was located directly on the sea and protected from the Bora. At that time,  Pliny the Elder mentioned the vines of the wine Pulcino ("Vinum Pucinum" - probably today's "Prosecco"), which were grown on the slopes.

Late Antiquity

The city was witness to the Battle of the Frigidus in the Vipava Valley in AD 394, in which Theodosius I defeated Eugenius. Despite the deposition of Romulus Augustulus at Ravenna in 476 and the ascension to power of Odoacer in Italy, Trieste was retained by the Roman Emperor seated at Constantinople, and thus became a Byzantine military outpost. In 539, the Byzantines annexed it to the Exarchate of Ravenna, despite Trieste's being briefly taken by the Lombards in 567, during their invasion of northern Italy, it was held until the time of the coming of the Franks.

Middle Ages
In 788, Trieste submitted to Charlemagne, who placed it under the authority of their count-bishop who in turn was under the Duke of Friùli. From 1081, the city came loosely under the Patriarchate of Aquileia, developing into a free commune by the end of the 12th century.

During the 13th and 14th centuries, Trieste became a maritime trade rival to the Republic of Venice which briefly occupied it in 1283–87, before coming under the patronage of the Patriarchate of Aquileia. After it committed a perceived offence against Venice, the Venetian State declared war against Trieste in July 1368 and by November had occupied the city. Venice intended to keep the city and began rebuilding its defences, but was forced to leave in 1372. By the Peace of Turin in 1381, Venice renounced its claim to Trieste and the leading citizens of Trieste petitioned Leopold III of Habsburg, Duke of Austria, to make Trieste part of his domains. The agreement of voluntary submission (dedizione) was signed at the castle of Graz on 30 September 1382.

The city maintained a high degree of autonomy under the Habsburgs, but was increasingly losing ground as a trade hub, both to Venice and to Ragusa. In 1463, a number of Istrian communities petitioned Venice to attack Trieste. Trieste was saved from utter ruin by the intervention of Pope Pius II who had previously been bishop of Trieste. However, Venice limited Trieste's territory to  outside the city. Trieste would be assaulted again in 1468–1469 by Holy Roman Emperor Frederick III. His sack of the city is remembered as the "Destruction of Trieste." He then restored the city walls for the fourth time.

Early modern period

Following an unsuccessful Habsburg invasion of Venice in the prelude to the 1508–16 War of the League of Cambrai, the Venetians occupied Trieste again in 1508, and were allowed to keep the city under the terms of the peace treaty. However, the Habsburg Empire recovered Trieste a little over one year later, when the conflict resumed. By the 18th century Trieste became an important port and commercial hub for the Austrians. In 1719, it was granted status as a free port within the Habsburg Empire by Emperor Charles VI, and remained a free port until 1 July 1791. The reign of his successor, Maria Theresa of Austria, marked the beginning of a very prosperous era for the city. Serbs settled Trieste largely in the 18th and 19th centuries, and they soon formed an influential and rich community within the city, as a number of Serb traders owned important business and had built palaces across Trieste.

19th century

In the following decades, Trieste was briefly occupied by troops of the French Empire during the Napoleonic Wars on several occasions, in 1797, 1805 and 1809. From 1809 to 1813, Trieste was annexed into Illyrian Provinces, interrupting its status of free port and losing its autonomy. The municipal autonomy was not restored after the return of the city to the Austrian Empire in 1813. Following the Napoleonic Wars, Trieste continued to prosper as the Free Imperial City of Trieste, a status that granted economic freedom, but limited its political self-government. The city's role as Austria's main trading port and shipbuilding centre was later emphasised with the foundation of the merchant shipping line Austrian Lloyd in 1836, whose headquarters stood at the corner of the Piazza Grande and Sanità (today's Piazza Unità d'Italia). By 1913 Austrian Lloyd had a fleet of 62 ships comprising a total of 236,000 tons. With the introduction of the constitutionalism in the Austrian Empire in 1860, the municipal autonomy of the city was restored, with Trieste becoming capital of the Austrian Littoral crown land.

In the later part of the 19th century, Pope Leo XIII considered moving his residence to Trieste or Salzburg because of what he considered a hostile anti-Catholic climate in Italy following the 1870 Capture of Rome by the newly established Kingdom of Italy. However, Emperor Franz Joseph rejected the idea. The modern Austro-Hungarian Navy used Trieste as a base and for shipbuilding. The construction of the first major trunk railway in the Empire, the Vienna-Trieste Austrian Southern Railway, was completed in 1857, a valuable asset for trade and the supply of coal.
 
In 1882, an Irredentist activist, Guglielmo Oberdan, attempted to assassinate Emperor Franz Joseph, who was visiting Trieste. Oberdan was caught, convicted, and executed. He was regarded as a martyr by radical Irredentists, but as a cowardly villain by the supporters of the Austro-Hungarian monarchy. Franz Joseph, who reigned another 34 years, never visited Trieste again.

20th century
At the beginning of the 20th century, Trieste was a bustling cosmopolitan city frequented by artists and philosophers such as James Joyce, Italo Svevo, Sigmund Freud, Zofka Kveder, Dragotin Kette, Ivan Cankar, Scipio Slataper, and Umberto Saba. The city was the major port on the "Austrian Riviera".

World War I, annexation to Italy and the Fascist era

Italy, in return for entering World War I on the side of the Allied Powers, had been promised substantial territorial gains, which included the former Austrian Littoral and western Inner Carniola. Italy therefore annexed the city of Trieste at the end of the war, in accordance with the provisions of the 1915 Treaty of London and the Italian-Yugoslav 1920 Treaty of Rapallo. Trieste had a large Italian majority.

In the late 1920s, the Slovene militant anti-fascist organisation TIGR carried out several bomb attacks in the city centre. In 1930 and 1941, two trials of Slovene activists were held in Trieste by the fascist Special Tribunal for the Security of the State. The economy improved in the late 1930s, and several large infrastructure projects were carried out.

Many people of Jewish origin in the city were killed as Italy was co-operating with Nazi Germany, and after the Germans seized northern Italy it was used as a hub to deport Jewish citizens

World War II and aftermath
 
Following the trisection of Slovenia, starting from the winter of 1941, the first Slovene Partisans appeared in Trieste province, although the resistance movement did not become active in the city itself until late 1943.

After the Italian armistice in September 1943, the city was occupied by Wehrmacht troops. Trieste became nominally part of the newly constituted Italian Social Republic, but it was de facto ruled by Germany, who created the Operation Zone of the Adriatic Littoral out of former Italian north-eastern regions, with Trieste as the administrative centre. The new administrative entity was headed by Friedrich Rainer. Under German occupation, the only concentration camp with a crematorium on Italian soil was built in a suburb of Trieste, at the Risiera di San Sabba on 4 April 1944. From 20 October 1943, to the spring of 1944, around 25,000 Jews and partisans were interrogated and tortured in the Risiera. Three-thousand - 4,000 of them were murdered here by shooting, beating or in gas vans. Most were imprisoned before being transferred to other concentration camps.

 The city saw intense Italian and Yugoslav partisan activity and suffered from Allied bombings, over 20 air raids in 1944–1945, targeting the oil refineries, port and marshalling yard but also causing considerable collateral damage to the city and 651 deaths among the population. The worst raid took place on 10 June 1944, when a hundred tons of bombs dropped by 40 USAAF bombers, targeting the oil refineries, resulted in the destruction of 250 buildings, damage to another 700 and 463 victims.

Occupation by Yugoslav partisans

On 30 April 1945, the Slovenian and Italian anti-Fascist Osvobodilna fronta (OF) and National Liberation Committee (Comitato di Liberazione Nazionale, or CLN) of Edoardo Marzari and Antonio Fonda Savio, made up of approximately 3,500 volunteers, incited a riot against the Nazi occupiers. On 1 May Allied members of the Yugoslav Partisans' 8th Dalmatian Corps took over most of the city, except for the courts and the castle of San Giusto, where the German garrisons refused to surrender to anyone other than New Zealanders. (The Yugoslavs had a reputation for shooting German and Italian prisoners.). The 2nd New Zealand Division under General Freyberg continued to advance towards Trieste along Route 14 around the northern coast of the Adriatic sea and arrived in the city the following day (see official histories The Italian Campaign and Through the Venetian Line). The German forces surrendered on the evening of 2 May, but were then turned over to the Yugoslav forces.

The Yugoslavs held full control of the city until 12 June, a period known in Italian historiography as the "forty days of Trieste". During this period, hundreds of local Italians and anti-Communist Slovenes were arrested by the Yugoslav authorities, and many of them were never seen again.
Some were interned in Yugoslav internment camps (in particular at Borovnica, Slovenia), while others were murdered on the Karst Plateau. British Field Marshal Harold Alexander condemned the Yugoslav military occupation, stating that "Marshal Tito's apparent intention to establish his claims by force of arms . . . [is] all too reminiscent of Hitler, Mussolini and Japan. It is to prevent such actions that we have been fighting this war."

After an agreement between the Yugoslav leader Josip Broz Tito and Field Marshal Alexander, the Yugoslav forces withdrew from Trieste, which came under a joint British-U.S. military administration. The Julian March was divided by the Morgan Line between Anglo-American and Yugoslav military administration until September 1947 when the Paris Peace Treaty established the Free Territory of Trieste.

Zone A of the Free Territory of Trieste (1947–54)

In 1947, Trieste was declared an independent city state under the protection of the United Nations as the Free Territory of Trieste. The territory was divided into two zones, A and B, along the Morgan Line established in 1945.

From 1947 to 1954, Zone A was occupied and governed by the Allied Military Government, composed of the American "Trieste United States Troops" (TRUST), commanded by Major General Bryant E. Moore, the commanding general of the American 88th Infantry Division, and the "British Element Trieste Forces" (BETFOR), commanded by Sir Terence Airey, who were the joint forces commander and also the military governors.

Zone A covered almost the same area of the current Italian Province of Trieste, except for four small villages south of Muggia (see below), which were given to Yugoslavia after the dissolution (see London Memorandum of 1954) of the Free Territory in 1954. Occupied Zone B, which was under the administration of Miloš Stamatović, then a colonel in the Yugoslav People's Army, was composed of the north-westernmost portion of the Istrian peninsula, between the Mirna River and the cape Debeli Rtič.

In 1954, in accordance with the Memorandum of London, the vast majority of Zone A—including the city of Trieste—joined Italy, whereas Zone B and four villages from Zone A (Plavje, Spodnje Škofije, Hrvatini, and Elerji) became part of Yugoslavia, divided between Slovenia and Croatia. The final border line with Yugoslavia and the status of the ethnic minorities in the areas was settled bilaterally in 1975 with the Treaty of Osimo. This line now constitutes the border between Italy and Slovenia.

Government

This is a list of the mayors of Trieste since 1949:

Economy
During the Austro-Hungarian era, Trieste became a leading European city in economy, trade and commerce, and was the fourth-largest and most important centre in the empire, after Vienna, Budapest and Prague. The economy of Trieste, however, fell into a decline after the city's annexation to Italy at the end of World War I. But Fascist Italy promoted a huge development of Trieste in the 1930s, with new manufacturing activities relating even to naval and armament industries (like the "Cantieri Aeronautici Navali Triestini (CANT)"). Allied bombings during World War II destroyed the industrial section of the city (mainly the shipyards). As a consequence, Trieste was a mainly peripheral city during the Cold War. However, since the 1970s, Trieste has experienced a certain economic revival.

While Trieste was politically isolated until the end of communism, the fall of the Iron Curtain, the accession of Slovenia, Croatia, Hungary, the Czech Republic and Slovakia to the EU and the increasing importance of the maritime Silk Road to Asia and Africa across the Suez Canal resulted in an increase in the trade via Trieste. The Port of Trieste is a trade hub with a significant commercial shipping business, busy container and oil terminals, and steel works. The port is part of the Silk Road because it can also be used by container ships with very large drafts. In this regard, the Port of Hamburg (HHLA) and the State of Hungary have holdings in the port area of Trieste and the associated facilities will be expanded by the Italian state in 2021 with €400 million.

The oil terminal feeds the Transalpine Pipeline which covers 40% of Germany's energy requirements (100% of the states of Bavaria and Baden-Württemberg), 90% of Austria and 50% of the Czech Republic's. The sea highway connecting the ports of Trieste and Istanbul is one of the busiest RO/RO [roll on roll-off] routes in the Mediterranean. The port is also Italy's and the Mediterranean's (and one of Europe's) greatest coffee ports, supplying more than 40% of Italy's coffee. The city is part of the Corridor 5 project to establish closer transport connections between Western and Eastern Europe, via countries such as Slovenia, Croatia, Hungary, Ukraine and Bosnia. 

The thriving coffee industry in Trieste began under Austria-Hungary, with the Austro-Hungarian government even awarding tax-free status to the city in order to encourage more commerce. Some remnants of Austria-Hungary's coffee-driven economic ambition remain, such as the Hausbrandt Trieste coffee company. As a result, present-day Trieste boasts many cafes, and is still known to this day as "the coffee capital of Italy". Companies active in the coffee sector have given birth to the Trieste Coffee Cluster as their main umbrella organisation, but also as an economic actor in its own right. A large part of Italian coffee imports (approx. 2–2.5 million sacks) are handled and processed in the city.

Two Fortune Global 500 companies have their global or national headquarters in the city, respectively: Assicurazioni Generali and Allianz. Other megacompanies based in Trieste are Fincantieri, one of the world's leading shipbuilding companies and the Italian operations of Wärtsilä. Prominent companies from Trieste include: AcegasApsAmga (Hera Group), Adriatic Assicurazioni SpA Autamarocchi SpA, Banca Generali SpA (BIT: BGN), Genertel, Genertellife, HERA Trading, Illy, Italia Marittima, Modiano, Nuovo Arsenale Cartubi Srl, Jindal Steel and Power Italia SpA; Pacorini SpA, Siderurgica Triestina (Arvedi Group), TBS Groug, U-blox, Telit, and polling and marketing company SWG.

The real estate market in Trieste has been growing in recent years. The relevant land register law comes from the old Austrian legislation and was adopted by the Italian legal system after 1918 in Trieste, as well as in the provinces of Trento, Bolzano and Gorizia as well as in some municipalities of the provinces of Udine, Brescia, Belluno and Vicenza.

Commercial fishing

Fishing boats anchor at Molo Veneziano near Piazza Venezia. In summer  (large lamps) are used for fishing and in autumn and winter  (smaller fishing nets) are used. In the Gulf of Trieste, because of the crystal-clear, nutrient-poor water with little plankton, fishing in itself is challenging. The fishing season lasts from May to July. In terms of fish reproduction, fishing is prohibited in August and restricted in winter. As of 2009, there are fewer than 200 professional fishermen in the city. There is also a small fishing port in the suburb Barcola. Some of the fish is sold directly from the boats or delivered to the town's shops and restaurants. The rare alici (anchovies - in the local dialect) from the Gulf of Trieste near Barcola, which are only caught at Sirocco, are particularly sought after because of their white meat and special taste and fetch high prices for fishermen.

Education and Research
The University of Trieste, founded in 1924, is a medium-size state-supported institution with 12 faculties, and boasts a wide and almost complete range of courses. It currently has about 23,000 students enrolled and 1,000 professors.
Trieste also hosts the Scuola Internazionale Superiore di Studi Avanzati (SISSA), a leading graduate and postgraduate teaching and research institution in the study of mathematics, theoretical physics, and neuroscience, and the MIB School of Management Trieste, one of Italy's top-five business schools.

As a result of the combination of research, business and funding, there are a growing number of spin-off companies in Trieste (partnerships in the production world exist with companies such as Cimolai, Danieli, Eni, Fincantieri, Generali, Illy, Mitsubishi, Vodafone) and proportionally the highest number of start-ups in Italy, the city also being referred to as Italy's Silicon Valley. Neurala, a company specialising in artificial intelligence, has chosen Trieste as its European research centre. Trieste has the highest proportion of researchers in Europe in relation to the population. They also appreciate the high quality of life and leisure time, so, as is often said, you can ski and swim by the sea in one day from Trieste.

There are three international schools offering primary and secondary education programmes in English in the greater metropolitan area: the International School of Trieste, the European School of Trieste, and the United World College of the Adriatic. Liceo scientifico statale "France Prešeren", and Liceo Anton Martin Slomšek  offer public secondary education in Slovene.

The city also hosts numerous national and international scientific research institutions: 
 AREA Science Park,
 ELETTRA, a synchrotron particle accelerator with free-electron laser capabilities for research and industrial applications, 
 International Centre for Theoretical Physics, which operates under a tripartite agreement among the Italian Government, UNESCO, and International Atomic Energy Agency (IAEA),
 Trieste Astronomical Observatory, 
 Istituto Nazionale di Oceanografia e Geofisica Sperimentale (OGS), which carries out research on oceans and geophysics; 
 International Centre for Genetic Engineering and Biotechnology, a United Nations centre of excellence for research and training in genetic engineering and biotechnology for the benefit of developing countries, 
 ICS-UNIDO, a UNIDO research centre in the areas of renewable energies, biofuels, medicinal plants, food safety and sustainable development,
 Carso Center for Advanced Research in Space Optics, 
 The World Academy of Sciences (TWAS),
 InterAcademy Panel: The Global Network of Science Academies (IAP), 
 Istituto nazionale di oceanografia e di geofisica sperimental, a national public scientific research organisation carrying out multidisciplinary studies in the field of earth sciences,
 Istituto Nazionale di Fisica Nucleare (Italian National Institute for Nuclear Physics), 
 Laboratorio di Biologica Marina,
 Laboratory TASC Technology and Nano Science,
 Orto Botanico dell'Università di Trieste, Civico Orto Botanico di Trieste.

The office of the International Union of Pure and Applied Physics (IUPAP) will be based in Trieste/Porto Vecchio from 2021.

Trieste is also a hub for corporate training and skills development hosting, among others, Generali's Generali Academy and Illy's Università del Caffe, founded in 1999. This competence centre was created to spread the culture of quality coffee through training all over the world and to carry out research and innovation.

Demographics

, there were 200,609 people residing in Trieste, located in the province of Trieste, Friuli Venezia Giulia, of whom 48.1% were male and 51.9% were female. Trieste had lost roughly ⅓ of its population since the 1970s, due to the crisis of the historical industrial sectors of steel and shipbuilding, a dramatic drop in fertility rates and fast population ageing. Minors (children aged 18 and younger) totalled 13.25% of the population compared to pensioners who number 27.9%. This compares with the Italian average of 18.06% (minors) and 19.94% (pensioners).

The average age of Trieste residents is 46 compared to the Italian average of 42. In the five years between 2002 and 2007, the population of Trieste declined by 3.5%, while Italy as a whole grew by 3.85%. However, in  the city has shown signs of stabilising thanks to growing immigration fluxes.

Since the annexation to Italy after World War I, there has been a steady decline in Trieste's demographic weight compared to other cities. In 1911, Trieste was the 4th largest city in the Austro-Hungarian Empire (3rd largest in the Austrian part of the Monarchy). In 1921, Trieste was the 8th largest city in the country, in 1961 the 12th largest, in 1981 the 14th largest, while in 2011 it dropped to the 15th place.

At the end of 2020, ISTAT estimated that there were 22,839 foreign-born residents in Trieste, representing 11.38% of the total city population. The largest autochthonous minority are Slovenes, Croats and Serbs, but there is also a large immigrant group from Balkan nations (particularly Serbia, Romania and Croatia): 4.95%, Asia: 0.52%, and sub-saharan Africa: 0.2%. Serbian community consists of both autochthonous and immigrant groups. Trieste is predominantly Roman Catholic.

Language

The particular dialect of Trieste, called tergestino, spoken until the beginning of the 19th century, was gradually overcome by the Triestine dialect of Venetian (a language deriving directly from Vulgar Latin) and other languages, including standard Italian, Slovene, and German. While Triestine and Italian were spoken by the largest part of the population, German was the language of the Austrian bureaucracy and Slovene was predominantly spoken in the surrounding villages. From the last decades of the 19th century, the number of speakers of Slovene grew steadily, reaching 25% of the overall population of Trieste in 1911.

According to the 1911 census, the proportion of Slovene speakers grew to 12.6% in the city centre (15.9% counting only Austrian citizens), 47.6% in the suburbs (53% counting only Austrian citizens), and 90.5% in the surroundings. They were the largest ethnic group in nine of the 19 urban neighbourhoods of Trieste, and represented a majority in seven of them. The Italian speakers, on the other hand, made up 60.1% of the population in the city centre, 38.1% in the suburbs, and 6.0% in the surroundings. They were the largest linguistic group in 10 of the 19 urban neighbourhoods, and represented the majority in seven of them (including all six in the city centre). German speakers amounted to 5% of the city's population, with the highest proportions in the city centre.

The city also had several other smaller ethnic communities, including Croats, Czechs, Istro-Romanians, Serbs and Greeks, who mostly assimilated either into the Italian or the Slovene-speaking communities. Altogether, in 1911 51.83% of the population of the municipality of Trieste spoke Italian, 24.79% spoke Slovene, 5.2% spoke German, 1% spoke Croatian, 0.3% spoke "other languages", and 16.8% were foreigners, including a further 12.9% Italians (immigrants from the Kingdom of Italy and thus considered separately from Triestine Italians) and 1.6% Hungarians.

By 1971, following the emigration of Slovenes to neighbouring Slovenia and the immigration of Italians from other regions (and from Yugoslav-annexed Istria) to Trieste, the percentage of Italian speakers had risen to 91.8%, and that of Slovenian speakers had dwindled to 5.7%.

Today, the dominant local dialect of Trieste is "Triestine" (triestin, pronounced ), a form of Venetian. This dialect and official Italian are spoken in the city, while Slovene is spoken in some of the immediate suburbs. There are also small numbers of Serbian, Croatian, German, Greek, and Hungarian speakers.

Main sights and vistas

In 2012, Lonely Planet listed the city of Trieste as the world's most underrated travel destination.

Castles

Castello Miramare (Miramare Castle)
The Castello Miramare, or Miramare Castle, on the waterfront  from Trieste, was built between 1856 and 1860 in a project by Carl Junker, commissioned by Archduke Maximilian. The castle gardens comprise a variety of trees, chosen by and planted on the orders of Maximilian. Features of the gardens include two ponds, one noted for its swans and the other for lotus flowers, the castle dependance ("Castelletto"), a bronze statue of Maximilian, and a small chapel where a cross made from the remains of the "Novara" is kept, the flagship on which Maximilian, brother of Emperor Franz Josef, set sail to become Emperor of Mexico.

During the 1930s, the castle was also the home of Prince Amedeo, Duke of Aosta, the last commander of Italian forces in East Africa during the Second World War. During the period of the application of the Instrument for the Provisional Regime of the Free Territory of Trieste, as established in the Treaty of Peace with Italy (Paris 10/02/1947), the castle served as headquarters for the United States Army's TRUST force.

Castel San Giusto
The Castel San Giusto, or Castle of San Giusto, was built upon the remains of previous castles on the site and took almost two centuries to build. The stages of the development of the castle's defensive structures are marked by the following periods: the central part built, under Frederick III, Holy Roman Emperor (1470–1), the round Venetian bastion (1508–9), the Hoyos-Lalio bastion and the Pomis, or "Bastione fiorito" dated 1630.

Places of worship
 The St Justus Cathedral (1320). Named after the city's Patron, Justus of Trieste, the church's interiors are decorated with Byzantine mosaics. It became a symbol of Italian Trieste during the Risorgimento.
 The Serbian Orthodox Church of St. Spyridon (1869). The building adopts the Greek-cross plan with five cupolas in the Byzantine tradition. The parish forms part of the Serbian Orthodox Eparchy of Austria and Switzerland.
 The Anglican Chiesa di Cristo (Christ Church) (1829)
 Sant'Antonio Taumaturgo (1842)
 The Mekhitarist Armenian Catholic Church (1859)
 The Waldensian and Helvetian Evangelical Basilica of St. Silvester (11th century)
 The Church of Santa Maria Maggiore (1682)
 The Augustan Evangelical-Lutheran Church (1874)
 The Greek Orthodox Church of San Nicolò dei Greci (1787). This church by the architect Matteo Pertsch (1818), with bell towers on both sides of the façade, follows the Austrian late baroque style. The interiors are decorated by golden ornaments.
 The Synagogue of Trieste (1912)
 The Temple of Monte Grisa (1960), a Roman Catholic church north of the city

Archaeological remains
 The Arco di Riccardo (33 BC) is a gate built in the Roman walls in 33 BC. It stands in Piazzetta Barbacan, in the narrow streets of the old town. Its current name is believed to be a corruption of Arco del Cardo, referring to the cardo, the main north-to-south Roman street; folk etymology credits it to Richard the Lionheart, a Crusader king of England.
 Basilica Forense (2nd century)
 Palaeochristian basilica
 Roman Age Temples: one dedicated to Athena, one to Zeus, both on the San Giusto hill.
The ruins of the temple dedicated to Zeus are next to the Forum, those of Athena's temple are under the basilica, visitors can see its basement.

Roman theatre
The Roman theatre lies at the foot of the San Giusto hill, facing the sea. The construction partially exploits the gentle slope of the hill, and much of the theatre is made of stone. The topmost portion of the steps and the stage were supposedly made of wood.

The statues which adorned the theatre, brought to light in the 1930s, are now preserved in the town museum. Three inscriptions from the Trajanic period mention a certain Q. Petronius Modestus, someone closely connected to the development of the theatre, which was erected during the second half of the 1st century.

Caves
In the entire Province of Trieste, there are 10 speleological groups out of 24 in the whole Friuli Venezia Giulia region. The Trieste plateau (Altopiano Triestino), called Kras or the Carso and covering an area of about  within Italy has approximately 1,500 caves of various sizes (like that of Basovizza, now a monument to the Foibe massacres).

Places of Interest
 The Austrian Quarter: Half of the city was built during the Austro-Hungarian period, giving the city some aspects of Vienna's architectural characteristics. The majority of buildings were built in Neoclassical, Art Nouveau, Eclectic and Liberty styles.
 Città Vecchia (Old City): Trieste boasts an extensive old city: there are many narrow and crooked streets with typical medieval houses. Almost all of the area is closed to traffic.
 Piazza Unità d'Italia, Trieste's central majestic square surrounded by 19th century architecture, and the largest seafront square in Europe.
 Piazza Venezia, with a view over the Adriatic. Since 2009, the monument to Archduke Maximilian has been located in Piazza Venezia again, looking over the Gulf of Trieste to the Miramare Castle, the subject wearing a Vice Admiral's uniform. The more than 8 metre high bronze monument, with the allegories of the four continents, is intended to honour Maximilian's philanthropy and his interest in science and art. It was sculpted by sculptor Johannes Schilling at the request of and under the direction of Baron Pasquale Revoltella. It was inaugurated in 1875 in the presence of Emperor Franz Joseph, later removed after 1918 and relocated to the Miramare Castle Park in 1961. Museo Revoltella is located in Piazza Venezia in the style of the Italian Renaissance with its six allegorical statues of the Venetian Francesco Bosa on the roof balustrade. 
 The Stazione Rogers (gas station "Aquila" designed by Ernesto Nathan Rogers) is considered an important building of Italian rationalism and post-war modernism and is now a multi-purpose centre for culture and architecture.
 Molo Sartorio, where still today the sea level for the Republic of Austria, a landlocked nation, is measured as "metres above the Adriatic". The historic "Antico Magazzino Vini" next to the Piazza Venezia was built in 1902 to store wine from Dalmatia and Istria. It has now been revitalised and now houses an Eataly. The former fish market, now renovated, is now a place for exhibitions and art, and is also located directly by the sea.
 Canal Grande, Trieste's grand canal, in the very centre of the city.
 Caffè San Marco, a historical coffee house in the centre of the city. Cafès play an important role in the Triestine economy, as Trieste developed a thriving coffee industry under Austria-Hungary, and is still known to this day as "the coffee capital of Italy".
 Barcola, a suburb of Trieste with a special microclimate and a high quality of life since ancient times. On its kilometre-long sea promenade towards Miramare Castle there are cafes and restaurants. Many locals spend their free time on this urban beach area, sunbathing, swimming and playing sports.The northernmost lighthouse in the Mediterranean, the Vittoria Light, located above Barcola, dominates the skyline above.
 Val Rosandra, a national park on the border between the Province of Trieste and Slovenia.

Beaches

Much of Trieste lies directly on the sea. Some bathing establishments are located in the very centre, like the "El Pedocin - Bagno marino La Lanterna" and the "Ausonia". The "Bagno Marino Ferroviario" has been located in Viale Miramare 30 since 1925. Many locals and students use their lunch break or free time to go to Barcola, which is an urban beach, to meet friends on the famous mile-long embankment. In the evening, many locals walk there between the bars with a view of the sea, the Alpine arc, Istria and the city.

Well-known are the 10 popular semi-circular units on the bank consisting of a viewing platform, sanitary facilities and changing rooms, which are popularly referred to as "Topolini". In the area of the Excelsior bathing establishment, which is located on a historic sand bank, there were very elegant Roman villas and their sports and bathing facilities in antiquity. Already in the 19th century there were numerous restaurants and cafes with shady vine arbors. The sea around Miramare Castle is today a nature reserve.

The pine forest of Barcola is located directly on the sea and is a meeting place for the inhabitants in every season. One of the best running routes in Trieste leads from Barcola to Miramare Castle and back. The small bathing complex Bagno da Sticco is right next to Miramare Castle. Further towards Grignano and Duino there are numerous bays and natural beaches. Due to the currents in the Adriatic, the water in the area of Trieste is very pure and not polluted by suspended matter from rivers. The current is counterclockwise.

Culture

The literary-intellectual centre of Trieste is mostly located in the very centre: the still-existing "Libreria Antiquaria Umberto Saba" located at the ground floor of Via San Nicolò No. 30, where James Joyce lived (where his son Giorgio was born and where Joyce wrote some of the short stories from Dubliners and Stephen Hero); the house in Via San Nicolò No. 31, where Umberto Saba spent his breaks at the cafe-milk shop "Walter" and the house in Via San Nicolò No. 32, in which the Berlitz School was located and where James Joyce taught and came into contact with Italo Svevo, are all of literary relevance. Around this area, at the end of Via San Nicolò, a life-size statue of Umberto Saba has been placed by the city government. Despite Via San Nicolò having become Trieste's high street, numerous cafes and restaurants used to be located there, especially the Berger beer hall at No. 17, which later became the Berger Grand Restaurant. Via San Nicolò No. 30 is also the symbolic centre of the homonymous novel by Roberto Curci. One of the most important Art Nouveau buildings in Trieste, is the "Casa Smolars", completed in 1905 in Via San Nicolò No. 36. Eppinger Caffè has been located nearby since around 1946. The former Palazzo della RAS, located in Piazza della Repubblica, has been completely renovated and has been a hotel since 2019.

The Greek Orthodox Church of San Nicolò dei Greci, which is dedicated to Saint Nicholas, the patron saint of seafarers and whose interior inspired James Joyce, is located by the sea in Piazza Tommaseo, next to the historic Caffè Tommaseo. This coffee house, also located at the beginning of Via San Nicolò, was opened in 1830. It is the oldest coffee house still in operation in Trieste and is still a meeting place for artists, intellectuals and merchants today.

Caffe Stella Polare is located in Piazza Ponterosso. This cosmopolitan coffee house was also frequented by Saba, Joyce, Guido Voghera, Virgilio Giotti and in particular by the former German-speaking minority from Trieste. With the end of World War II and the arrival of the Anglo-Americans in the city, this café became a hangout place of many soldiers and a famous ballroom to meet local young women.

Trieste has a lively cultural scene with various theatres. Among these figure Teatro Lirico Giuseppe Verdi, Politeama Rossetti, the Teatro La Contrada, the Slovene theatre in Trieste (since 1902), Teatro Miela, and several smaller ones.

There are also a number of museums. Among these are:
 Diego de Henriquez war museum
 Museo Sartorio
 Revoltella Museum modern art gallery
 Civico Museo di Storia Naturale di Trieste (natural history museum) containing fossils of Hominids.
 Civico Orto Botanico di Trieste, the municipal botanical garden
 Orto Botanico dell'Università di Trieste, the University of Trieste's botanical garden

Two important national monuments:
 The Risiera di San Sabba (Risiera di San Sabba Museum), a National monument commemorating the holocaust genocide. It was the only Nazi concentration camp with a crematorium in Italy.
 The Foiba di Basovizza, a National monument. It is a reminder of the killings of Italians by Yugoslav partisans after World War II.

The Slovenska gospodarsko-kulturna zveza—Unione Economica-Culturale Slovena is the umbrella organisation bringing together cultural and economic associations belonging to the Slovene minority.

Trieste hosts the annual ITS (International Talent Support Awards) young fashion designer competition. The power metal band Rhapsody was founded in Trieste by the city's natives Luca Turilli and Alex Staropoli.

Media 
Newspapers
 Il Piccolo
 Primorski dnevnik
 La Gazzetta Giuliana

Broadcasting
Television
 RAI Friuli Venezia-Giulia
 Tele Quattro

Radio
 Radioattività Trieste
 Radio Fragola
 Radio Punto Zero

Publishing
 Asterios Editore
 Lint Editoriale

Sports
The local football club, Triestina, is one of the oldest clubs in Italy. Notably, it was runner-up in the 1947–1948 season of the Italian first division (Serie A), losing the championship to Torino.

Trieste is notable for having had two football clubs participating in the championships of two different nations at the same time during the period of the Free Territory of Trieste, due to the schism within the city and region created by the post-war demarcation. Triestina played in the Italian first division (Serie A). Although it faced relegation after the first season after the Second World War, the FIGC modified the rules, as it was deemed important to keep the club in the league. The following year the club played its best season with a 3rd-place finish. Meanwhile, Yugoslavia bought A.S.D. Ponziana, a small team in Trieste, which under a new name, Amatori Ponziana Trst, played in the Yugoslavian league for three years. Triestina went bankrupt in the 1990s, but after being re-founded, it regained a position in the Italian second division (Serie B) in 2002. Ponziana was renamed "Circolo Sportivo Ponziana 1912" and currently plays in Friuli Venezia Giulia Group of Promozione, which is the 7th level of the Italian league.

Trieste also has a well-known basketball team, Pallacanestro Trieste, which reached its zenith in the 1990s under coach Bogdan Tanjević when, with large financial backing from sponsors Stefanel, it was able to sign players such as Dejan Bodiroga, Fernando Gentile and Gregor Fučka, stars of European basketball. At the end of the 2017–18 season, the team, now trained by coach Eugenio Dalmasson and sponsored by Alma, won promotion to the Lega Basket Serie A, Italy's highest basketball league, 14 years after its last tenure.

Many sailing clubs have roots in the city which contribute to Trieste's strong tradition in that sport.The Barcolana regatta, first held in 1969, is the world's largest sailing race by number of participants.

Local sporting facilities include the Stadio Nereo Rocco, a UEFA-certified stadium with seating capacity of 32,500; the Palatrieste, an indoor sporting arena sitting 7,000 people, and Piscina Bruno Bianchi, a large Olympic size swimming pool.

On 26 August 1985  American basketball player Michael Jordan dunked so hard that the backboard shattered during a Nike exhibition game. The signed jersey and shoes (including one of the tiny shards of glass in the sole of the left shoe) that the player wore during the famous shattered backboard game were later auctioned. The moment the glass broke was filmed and is often cited as a particularly important milestone in Jordan's rise.

Film
Trieste has been portrayed on screen a number of times, with films often shot on location. In 1942 the early neorealist Alfa Tau! was filmed partly in the city.

Cinematic interest in Trieste peaked during the height of the "Free Territory" era between 1947 and 1954, with international films such as Sleeping Car to Trieste and Diplomatic Courier portraying it as a hotbed of espionage. These films, along with The Yellow Rolls-Royce (1964), conveyed an image of the city as a cosmopolitan place of conflict between Great Powers, a portrayal which resembles Casablanca (1943). Italian filmmakers, by contrast, portrayed Trieste as unquestionably Italian in a series of patriotic films including Trieste mia! and Ombre su Trieste.

In 1963 the city hosted the first International Festival of Science Fiction Film (Festival internazionale del film di fantascienza), which ran until 1982. Under the name Science Plus Fiction (now Trieste Science+Fiction Festival), the festival was revived in 2000.

A new interest in the city has been sparked by movies such as The Invisible Boy (2014), its sequel The Invisible Boy—Second Generation and La Porta Rossa, a TV series.

Triestine cuisine

There are three types of eateries: the conventional restaurant; the buffet, where ham, meat loaf, goulash, roast meat, Kaiserfleisch, tongue and belly meat are served; and the osmiza, a characteristic eatery in the Karst, where locally farmed products are enjoyed paired with wine.

Local cuisine has been influenced by the various ethnic groups which have populated the city, mainly Central Europeans. Traditional main courses include Jota, Minestra de Bisi Spacai (Pea stew), Rotolo di Spinaci in Straza (spinach rolls), Sardoni Impanai (breaded anchovies, a sought-after delicacy), Capuzi Garbi (krauts), Capuzi Garbi in Tecia (sautéed krauts), Vienna sausages, goulash, ćevapi and frito misto (fried fish). Popular desserts are: Presnitz, Fave Triestine, Titola, Crostoli, Struccolo de Pomi, Kugelhupf, Rigo Jancsi and the Triester Torte.

"Capo Triestino" (also "Capo in B" or "Capo in bicchiere") is considered a local coffee speciality. This miniature cappuccino in a glass cup is usually consumed at the bar.

Transport

Maritime transport

Trieste's maritime location and its former long-term status as part of the Austrian and, between 1867 and 1918, Austro-Hungarian empires, made the Port of Trieste the major commercial port for much of the landlocked areas of central Europe. In the 19th century, a new port district known as the Porto Nuovo was built northeast of the city centre.

Significant volumes of goods pass through the container, steel works and oil terminals, all located to the south of the city centre. After many years of stagnation, a change in the leadership placed the port on a steady growth path, recording a 40% increase in shipping traffic .

Today the port of Trieste is one of the largest Italian ports and next to Gioia Tauro the only deep water port in the central Mediterranean for seventh generation container ships.

Rail transport

Railways came early to Trieste, due to the importance of its port and the need to transport people and goods inland. The first railroad line to reach Trieste was the Südbahn, built by the Austrian government in 1857. It approaches Trieste through the village of Villa Opicina, a few kilometres from the centre but over  higher in elevation. Due to this, the line takes a  detour to the north, gradually descending before terminating at the Trieste Centrale railway station.

In 1887, the Imperial Royal Austrian State Railways opened a new railway line, the Trieste–Hrpelje railway, from the new port of Trieste to Hrpelje-Kozina, on the Istrian railway. The intended function of the new line was to reduce the Austrian Empire's dependence on the Südbahn network. Its opening gave Trieste a second station south of the original one, which was named Trieste Sant'Andrea. The two stations were connected by a railway line that in the initial plans was meant to be an interim solution: the Rive railway, which survived until 1981, when it was replaced by the Galleria di Circonvallazione, a  railway tunnel route to the east of the city.

With the opening of the Transalpina Railway from Vienna, Austria via Jesenice and Nova Gorica in 1906, the St. Andrea station was replaced by a new, more capacious, facility, named Trieste stazione dello Stato, later Trieste Campo Marzio, now a railway museum, and the original station came to be identified as Trieste stazione della Meridionale or Trieste Meridionale. This railway also approached Trieste via Villa Opicina, but it took a rather shorter loop southwards towards the sea front. Freight lines from the dock area include container services to northern Italy and to Budapest, Hungary, together with rolling highway services to Salzburg, Austria and Frankfurt, Germany.

There are direct intercity and high-speed trains between Trieste and Venice, Verona, Turin, Milan, Rome, Florence, Naples and Bologna. Passenger trains also run between Villa Opicina and Ljubljana.

On special occasion, the historic ETR 252 "Arlecchino" runs the Venezia Santa Lucia-Trieste Centrale route, operated by Fondazionefs. This is one of four examples ever built.

Air transport
Trieste is served by the Trieste – Friuli Venezia Giulia Airport (IATA: TRS). The airport serves domestic and international destinations and is fully connected to the national railway and highway networks. The Trieste Airport railway station links the passenger terminal directly to the Venice–Trieste railway thanks to a 425-metre long skybridge. A 16 platform bus terminal, a multi-storey car park with 500 lots and a car park with 1,000 lots give public and private motor vehicles rapid access to the A4 Trieste-Turin highway. At the interchange near Palmanova, the A4 branches off to Autostrada A23 linking to Austria's Süd Autobahn (A2) via Udine and Tarvisio. In the southern direction, this highway also offers seamless interconnection to Slovenia's A1 Motorway, and through that to highway networks in Croatia, Hungary, and the Balkans.

Local transport

Local public transport is operated by Trieste Trasporti, a part of TPL FVG, which operates a network of around 60 bus routes and two ferry lines. They also operate the Opicina Tramway, a hybrid between a tramway and funicular railway, providing a more direct link between the city centre and Opicina.

Notable people

International relations
Trieste hosts the Secretariat of the Central European Initiative, an inter-governmental organisation among Central and South-Eastern European states.

In recent years, Trieste has been chosen as host to a number of high level bilateral and multilateral meetings such as: the Western Balkans Summit in 2017; the Italo-Russian Bilateral Summit in 2013 (Letta-Putin) and the Italo-German Bilateral Summit in 2008 (Berlusconi-Merkel); the G8 meetings of Foreign Affairs and Environment Ministers, respectively in 2009 and 2001. In December 2020, Trieste hosted three-party talks between the foreign ministers of Italy, Croatia, and Slovenia on the delimitation of their respective exclusive economic zone. In 2020, Trieste was also nominated the European Science Capital by Euroscience. In August 2021 it hosted the G20 Meeting of Ministers of Innovation and Research.

Sister cities and twin towns

Trieste is twinned with:
  Beirut, Lebanon (since 1956)
  Douala, Cameroon (since 1971)
  Graz, Austria (since 1973)
  Santos, Brazil (since 1977)
  Southampton, England, United Kingdom (since 2002)
  Le Havre, France

See also

 Abdus Salam International Centre for Theoretical Physics (ICTP)
 Bathyscaphe Trieste, Swiss-designed, Italian-built deep sea exploration vehicle
 History of the Jews in Trieste
 INFN (National Institute of Nuclear Physics)
 International School for Advanced Studies (SISSA)
 Teatro Comunale Giuseppe Verdi
 Treaty of peace with Italy (1947)

Notes

References

External links

 Municipality of Trieste 

 
Cities and towns in Friuli-Venezia Giulia
Free imperial cities
Mediterranean port cities and towns in Italy
Roman sites of Friuli-Venezia Giulia
Port cities and towns of the Adriatic Sea
History of Slovenes in Italy
German diaspora in Italy
Czech diaspora in Italy
Yugoslav diaspora in Italy
Hungarian diaspora in Italy
Populated places established in the 2nd millennium BC